Benjamín Rafael Núñez Rodríguez (born 15 May 1995), commonly known as Benji, is a Spanish-born Dominican footballer who plays as a right back for Tercera División club AD Ceuta FC and the Dominican Republic national team.

Early life
Benji was raised in El Doctoral, a neighborhood in Vecindario, Gran Canaria, Canary Islands.

Club career
Benji is a former player of CD San Pedro Mártir (two stints), UD Vecindario, Real Ávila CF and UD Las Palmas C.

In November 2022, Benji signed for CF Villanovense.

International career
Benji is a former member of the Canary Islands autonomous under–18 team. He made his senior debut for the Dominican Republic in a 0-1 loss to Saint Lucia on 16 November 2019.

Personal life
Benji has a twin brother, Fran Núñez, also a footballer, who plays for SCR Peña Deportiva and is also a member of the Dominican Republic national team.

References

1995 births
Living people
Citizens of the Dominican Republic through descent
Twin sportspeople
Spanish twins
Dominican Republic twins
Dominican Republic footballers
Dominican Republic international footballers
Spanish footballers
Footballers from the Canary Islands
People from Gran Canaria
Sportspeople from the Province of Las Palmas
Spanish people of Dominican Republic descent
Sportspeople of Dominican Republic descent
Association football fullbacks
UD Vecindario players
UD Las Palmas C players
AD Ceuta FC players
CF Villanovense players
Tercera División players
Segunda Federación players